Utah State Route 189 may refer to:

 Utah State Route 189, the legislative overlay designation for U.S. Route 189 (US-189) within Utah, United States. By Utah State law, US-189 within the state (except concurrencies) has been defined as "State Route 189" since 1977)
 Utah State Route 189 (1935–1969), a former state highway in Ephraim, Utah, United States

See also
 List of state highways in Utah
 List of U.S. Highways in Utah
 List of highways numbered 189